Allardt Presbyterian Church (also known as the First Presbyterian Church) is a historic church on Tennessee State Route 52 (Pennsylvania Avenue) in Allardt, Tennessee. It is affiliated with the Presbytery of Middle Tennessee and Presbyterian Church (USA).

The Gothic Revival church building was constructed in 1903 and added to the National Register of Historic Places in 1991.

References

Presbyterian churches in Tennessee
Churches on the National Register of Historic Places in Tennessee
Buildings and structures in Fentress County, Tennessee
Churches completed in 1903
Carpenter Gothic church buildings in Tennessee
National Register of Historic Places in Fentress County, Tennessee